Epiperipatus diadenoproctus is a species of velvet worm in the Peripatidae family. This species is brown with a series of light brown arcs on each side forming circles down its back. Males of this species have 26 to 28 pairs of legs, usually 27; females have 29 or 30, usually 29. The type locality is in Minas Gerais, Brazil.

References

Onychophorans of tropical America
Onychophoran species
Animals described in 2011